Angustia was a fort in the Roman province of Dacia in the 2nd and 3rd centuries AD.

Bibliography
 Nicolae Gudea: Castrul roman de la Breţcu. In: Acta Musei Porolissensis 4, 1980, 255-334.
 Dumitru Protase: Angvstia (Breţcu). In: Angustia 1, 1996, 85-88. 
 Nicolae Gudea: Der Dakische Limes. Materialien zu seiner Geschichte. In: Jahrbuch des Römisch-Germanischen Zentralmuseums Mainz. 44, 2, 1997, 62–63 PDF.

Notes

External links

Roman castra from Romania - Google Maps / Earth

Roman Dacia
Archaeological sites in Romania
Roman legionary fortresses in Romania
Ancient history of Transylvania
Historic monuments in Covasna County